Sonda is a small borough in Lüganuse Parish Ida-Viru County, in northeastern Estonia. Prior to 2017, it was the administrative centre of the former Sonda Parish.

References

Boroughs and small boroughs in Estonia
Lüganuse Parish